Mesopotamia was a sugar plantation in Westmoreland Parish, Jamaica, north of Savanna-la-Mar on the Cabaritta River. It was adjacent to the Friendship and Greenwich estate.

History
The plantation was established around 1700 and according to official returns was one of 23 sugar plantations in the parish that employed over 200 slaves.

It was associated with the Barham family. It was first in the ownership of Dr Henry Barham (c.1728-1746) and subsequently Joseph Foster Barham (c.1746-1789) and Joseph Foster Barham II (c.1789-1832).

The chemist John Buddle Blyth was baptised at Mesopotamia in 1816. His father John Blythe was attorney for Mesopotamia in the early 19th-century.

See also
 List of plantations in Jamaica

References

External links 
https://books.google.co.uk/books?id=JrMyBQAAQBAJ&lpg=PA62&ots=rqHwpgx3VJ&dq=Mesopotamia%20in%20Westmoreland%20Parish&pg=PA62#v=onepage&q=Mesopotamia%20in%20Westmoreland%20Parish&f=false

Westmoreland Parish
18th-century establishments in Jamaica
Plantations in Jamaica